Cunziria (also spelled Canziria) is an 18th-century village in Vizzini, Sicily.

History 
Cunziria is situated in an open valley adjacent to hills covered with prickly pears. The buildings' structure and architectural details make it an example of the rural agricultural style of 18th-century Sicily. The ruins of the church of Saint 'Egidio, which may date from Roman times, are located in the village.

Due to Cunziria's proximity to a spring, tanning was once a successful local industry, using tannins extracted from sumac. The village huts were created from an iron-colored local stone and were strategically positioned on the surrounding hills to increase sun exposure and hasten the drying of animal skins. Skins were cleaned in large tanks dug into rocks, some of which were later dug into the ground. Several have been uncovered in recent excavations.

The tanning industry began to decline around the end of the 1920s, although it continued until the 1960s

Legend 
Cunziria is the setting for a famous duel, which Giovanni Verga described in his short story , which was later adapted into the opera of the same name by Mascagni. According to the legend, the married Lola and her paramour, ex-soldier Turiddu, secretly met in Cunziria under the light of a full moon to consummate their love. Lola's husband, Alfio, a mule-driver had been away working in Francofonte. Lola and Turiddu's affair was shortly discovered and rumors spread around the village, reaching Alfio. Feeling dishonored, Alfio challenged Turiddu to a duel "in the prickly-pear grove of Cantina." The combatants walk to Cunziria together, where they exchange blows before Alfio kills Turridu.

In Verga's telling, the location of the lovers' assignations is not stated. The affair is betrayed by Santa, Turiddu's jealous ex-lover, whom he wooed to make Lola jealous when Lola first spurned his advances.

Popular culture 

In 1983, the film adaptation of Cavalleria Rusticana, directed by Franco Zeffirelli, was filmed in Cunziria. The director displayed the splendor of the place, which was described as "a strange mixture of theatrical fiction and reality of rural life, a flow and a reflux of the theater in the truth and of the truth in the theater."

In 1996, Gabriele Lavia's film La Lupa was filmed in Cunziria. Cunziria's well-preserved buildings allowed Lavia to show an archaic society in which men and women worked continuously in the fields. His movie had a dark meaning; this city was haunted by ghosts and everybody was possessed, but acted normal. These ghosts possessed more and more people to create an uprising. Soon the whole world would be under the possession of the Cunzirian ghosts.

Lorenzo Muscoso began to use Cunziria as the setting for a scenic outdoor theater. Muscoso believes that his theatrical productions can redevelop the village.

Muscoso first took a part of the Cavalleria Rusticana and turned it into the opera The Duel, which was performed on April 25, 2014, on the occasion of the Festa Dei Sapori e Saperi, with the participation of nearly 2000 people. The Duel is the first example of an artistic experiment called Motion Theater. It combines cinema and theater through the use of giant screens, a soundtrack, and actor movements in front of the scenery.

Additional productions included Marines meet Verga and, two years later, Marines Revisit Verga, a collaboration between his association and the American base at Sigonella, the municipality of Vizzini, and a local forestry company. The productions received reviews in RAI, la Repubblica and Ansa. In a solemn ceremony organized at Sigonella, Muscoso received a commendation from the General of the Marines.

Another show was Romanzo Verghiano, an itinerant journey through the neighborhoods of the village where the audience meets the characters of the famous operas of Verga and finally the Presepe Verghiano, the original staging of the Nativity in the world of Giovanni Verga.

References 

Vizzini